Stony Point railway station is the terminus of the diesel-hauled Stony Point line in Victoria, Australia. It serves the town of Crib Point, and it opened on 17 December 1889.

In 1910, a turntable was provided at the station. By November 1960, it was out of use and, by March 1963, was abolised.

In 1976, a siding at the Up end of the station was removed. The following year, in 1977, the goods yard was closed.

On 22 June 1981, the passenger service between Frankston and Stony Point was withdrawn and replaced with a bus service, with the line between Long Island Junction and Stony Point also closing on the same day. On 16 September 1984, promotional trips for the reopening of the line began and, on 27 September of that year, the passenger service was reinstated.

A run-around loop exists to the north and west of the station, but has not been regularly used since locomotive hauled services ceased in April 2008.

Platforms and services

Stony Point has one platform. It is serviced by Metro Trains' Stony Point line services.

Platform 1:
  all stations services to Frankston

Transport links

A jetty is located near the station, from which ferry services operate to Tankerton, on French Island, and Cowes, on Phillip Island.

Gallery

References

External links
 Melway map at street-directory.com.au

Railway stations in Melbourne
Railway stations in Australia opened in 1889
Railway stations in the Shire of Mornington Peninsula